Antonio Cosentino may refer to:

Antonio Cosentino (artist), Turkish artist
Antonio Cosentino (sailor), Italian sailor